The Khan al-Asal Police Academy, also known as the Aleppo police academy, the Syrian police academy or the Police Academy, is a police educational and training institution in Aleppo, Syria.

The Police Academy during the Syrian Civil War
After eight days of fighting that left 200 troops and rebels dead, the rebels seized most of the police academy on 3 March 2013. The Syrian Army recaptured the police academy in February 2020.

References

Educational institutions in Syria
Law enforcement in Syria
Mount Simeon District